Edward Anthony Sadowski (July 11, 1917 – September 18, 1990) was an American professional basketball player.

Early life
Sadowski was born in Akron, Ohio. He was part of a large family, with at least three brothers and three sisters.

College athletics
He starred at Seton Hall University during the late 1930s and early 1940s.  A  center, he led Seton Hall to its only undefeated season (1939–1940).

Career

Professional basketball
Sadowski later played professionally in the National Basketball League, the Basketball Association of America, and the National Basketball Association (which was formed after a merger between the first two leagues in this list).

As a member of the Boston Celtics in 1947–48, Sadowski ranked third in the BAA in points per game (19.4) and was named to the All-BAA first team, made him the first ever Boston Celtics player to be named to the All-BAA/NBA Team.

After basketball
Retiring from basketball in 1950, he worked in labor relations for the Cities Service Oil Company.

Personal life and later years
Sadowski and his wife, Charlotte, had two sons, Edward and Bill. Sadowski died of cancer at age 73 in his Wall Township, New Jersey home in 1990.

BAA/NBA career statistics

Regular season

Playoffs

References

External links
Career statistics

1917 births
1990 deaths
American expatriate basketball people in Canada
American men's basketball players
Baltimore Bullets (1944–1954) players
Basketball coaches from New Jersey
Basketball players from New Jersey
Boston Celtics players
Centers (basketball)
Cleveland Rebels players
Detroit Eagles players
Fort Wayne Zollner Pistons players
People from Wall Township, New Jersey
Philadelphia Warriors players
Seton Hall Pirates men's basketball players
Sportspeople from Monmouth County, New Jersey
Toronto Huskies coaches
Toronto Huskies players